Rodrigo Bareiro (born in Posadas, Misiones) is a retired Argentine footballer who played for Gimnasia y Esgrima de La Plata, Chilean club Santiago Morning, and Club 8 de Diciembre de María Auxiliadora in Paraguay.

References
 

Living people
Argentine footballers
Argentine expatriate footballers
Club de Gimnasia y Esgrima La Plata footballers
Santiago Morning footballers
Argentine Primera División players
Chilean Primera División players
Expatriate footballers in Chile
Association football forwards
Year of birth missing (living people)
Footballers from La Plata